Grandpa Goes to Town is a 1940 American comedy film directed by Gus Meins and written by Jack Townley. The film stars James Gleason, Lucile Gleason, Russell Gleason, Harry Davenport, Lois Ranson and Maxie Rosenbloom. The film was released on April 14, 1940, by Republic Pictures.

Plot
After selling their house, the Higgins family is convinced by a crafty real estate agent to invest the proceeds in a hotel at Coyote Wells, Nevada, sight unseen. Upon arriving at their new establishment, the Higginses find that what has been described as a thriving western community is actually a ghost town, inhabited by a gang of mobsters fleeing from the law. Things look bleak until two film actors, dressed as prospectors, appear in town and the Higginses mistake them for real gold miners and spread word of a gold strike. This announcement results in a rush of miners which transforms Coyote Wells into a boom town and the Higgins' hotel into a profitable enterprise. Their prosperity is short lived however, when the miners fail to discover gold and decide to lynch the family. Grandpa saves their hides by salting the abandoned mine with gold dust, but as he leaves the mine, he accidentally sets off a stick of dynamite. Hurrying back to Apache Wells, Grandpa rounds up the prospectors and takes them back to the mine where, much to everyone's amazement, Grandpa discovers that the explosion has uncovered a rich vein of gold. As the miners prepare to rush to the land office to file their claims, Mugsy, the head of the gangsters, pulls a gun and announces that he is holding everyone hostage until his men can file a claim on the mine. All seems lost until Grandpa mounts an old nag and gallops into town, where he convinces the movie extras, costumed as Indians, to stage a raid on the gangsters and free the miners.

Cast
James Gleason as Joe Higgins
Lucile Gleason as Lil Higgins
Russell Gleason as Sidney Higgins
Harry Davenport as Grandpa
Lois Ranson as Betty Higgins
Maxie Rosenbloom as Al 
Tommy Ryan as Tommy Higgins
Arturo Godoy as himself 
Noah Beery, Sr. as Sam
Douglas Meins as Bill
Garry Owen as Muggsy
Ray Turner as Homer
Lee 'Lasses' White as Ike
Walter Miller as Director
Emmett Lynn as Jaspar
Joe Caits as Woodrow
Ledda Godoy as herself

References

External links
 

1940 films
American comedy films
1940 comedy films
Republic Pictures films
Films directed by Gus Meins
Films scored by William Lava
Films produced by Gus Meins
Films with screenplays by Jack Townley
American black-and-white films
Films scored by Paul Sawtell
1940s English-language films
1940s American films